Sailing has featured as a sport at the Youth Olympic Summer Games since its first edition in 2010. The Youth Olympic Games are multi-sport event and the games are held every four years just like the Olympic Games. With sailing limited to four events sailing has chosen to feature athlete under 16 in two disciplines. This allows older youth competitors in sailing to focus on the Olympic disciplines through events like the ISAF Youth Sailing World Championships as the games could permit sailors up to 18 years old.

Participating nations

Medal table
As of the 2018 Summer Youth Olympics.

Medalist by Games

2010 Youth Olympic Games Events

2014 Youth Olympic Games Events

2018 Youth Olympic Games Events

See also
Sailing at the Summer Olympics

External links
 ISAF Youth Olympics Microsite Website
 ISAF Techno 293 Microsite Website
 International Techno 293 Class Association Website
 ISAF Byte Microsite Website
 International Byte Class Association Website
 Youth Olympic Games

 
Sports at the Summer Youth Olympics
Youth Olympics